Doctor Light is the name (or codename) of various fictional scientists.

 Doctor Light (character), any of the characters from DC Comics
Doctor Light (Arthur Light), the DC Comics supervillain
 Doctor Light (Kimiyo Hoshi), the DC Comics superheroine
 Doctor Light (Mega Man), the Mega Man character

See also
 The Light, an evil scientist who battled Starman

fr:Dr. Light